Ana Konjuh was the defending champion, having won the event in 2013, however she participated in the qualifying round and lost to Urszula Radwańska in the first round.

Marie Bouzková won the title, defeating Anhelina Kalinina in the final, 6–4, 7–6(7–5).

Seeds

Main draw

Finals

Top half

Section 1

Section 2

Bottom half

Section 3

Section 4

External links 
 Main draw

Girls' Singles
US Open, 2014 Girls' Singles